The Diocese of Greensburg is a Catholic diocese centered in Greensburg, Pennsylvania, with 78 parishes in Armstrong, Fayette, Indiana, and Westmoreland counties in Western Pennsylvania in the United States. The diocese was founded on March 10, 1951 and is led by bishop Larry J. Kulick as the 6th Bishop of Greensburg.

Bishops 

Bishops of the diocese and their tenures of service:

Bishops of Greensburg

 Hugh L. Lamb (1951-1960)
 William G. Connare (1960-1987)
 Anthony G. Bosco (1987-2004)
 Lawrence E. Brandt (2004-2015)
 Edward C. Malesic (2015–2020), appointed Bishop of Cleveland.
 Larry J. Kulick (2021-present)

Former auxiliary bishop

 Norbert F. Gaughan (1975–1984), appointed Bishop of Gary

Other priests of the diocese who became bishops

 Cyril John Vogel, appointed Bishop of Salina in 1965
 Giuseppe De Andrea, appointed Apostolic Nuncio and Titular Archbishop in 2001 and later Assessor of the Order of the Holy Sepulchre
 Lawrence T. Persico, appointed Bishop of Erie in 2012

Parishes 
As of 2017, there are seventy-eight operating parishes within the Diocese of Greensburg; thirty-eight of these operate in a partnered configuration.  A diocesan strategic planning process began in 2006, which has resulted in closures of parishes and chapels, as well as partnering of parishes that have remained open, with the last of these changes occurring in 2013.

Schools 

There are 18 educational facilities spread throughout the geographical terrain of the diocesan limits. There are 2 junior-senior high schools, 12 diocesan elementary schools and 3 non-diocesan Catholic schools

High schools 
 Geibel Catholic Junior-Senior High School is located in Connellsville Township in northern Fayette County and serves the southern half of the diocesan territory. A Middle School concept was added at the beginning of the 2007-08 School Term, bringing the grade levels served at this facility 7-12.
 Greensburg Central Catholic Junior-Senior High School is located in Hempfield Township in central Westmoreland County and serves the central and northern sections of the diocesan territory. This school serves grades 7-12.

Grand jury investigation of clergy sex abuse, lawsuits and diocese's response

In early 2016, a grand jury investigation, led by Pennsylvania Attorney General Josh Shapiro, began an inquiry into sexual abuse by Catholic clergy in six Pennsylvania dioceses:  Greensburg, Allentown, Scranton, Harrisburg, Pittsburgh, and Erie.  The Diocese of Altoona-Johnstown and the Archdiocese of Philadelphia were not included, as they had been the subjects of earlier investigations.

According to The Philadelphia Inquirer, in 2017 the Diocese of Harrisburg and the Diocese of Greensburg attempted to shut down the grand jury investigation.

On July 27, 2018, the Pennsylvania Supreme Court ordered that a redacted copy of the grand jury report be released to the public; this release occurred in August 2018.

On July 31, 2018, John T. Sweeney, a former priest in the Diocese of Greenburg, pleaded guilty to molesting a 4th grade boy at some point between September 1991 and June 1992.  Immediately following Sweeney's plea, the Diocese of Greensburg made a statement pledging future cooperation. In the statement, which was reported by Crux on August 4, the Diocese of Greensburg agreed to continue educating "both children and adults in parishes and schools of the Diocese of Greensburg on how to spot and report suspected abuse." The Diocese also agreed to recommend reporting incidents of sexual abuse to the PA ChildLine and report any alleged incident of sexual abuse to "PA Childline and the appropriate district attorney."

On August 9, 2018, Greensburg Bishop Edward Malesic issued an apology on behalf the Diocese, acknowledged there were numerous reports of sex abuse of children between the 1950s and 1980s, and announced that the Diocese would release the names of the accused clergy when the grand jury report is published.  The grand jury report was published on August 14, 2018 and showed that of the 301 priests accused of sexual abuse in the six dioceses, only 20 clergy were from the Diocese of Greensburg.  
The report also showed that one of the accused in the Diocese of Greensburg also impregnated a 17 year old girl.  The priest then covered up the pregnancy by marrying the girl after forging the head pastor's name on a marriage certificate and then filing for divorce months later.  Despite fathering a child with a minor and being married and divorced, the priest still remained in the ministry.

On December 21, 2018, Sweeney was given a 11 1/2 month to 5 year prison sentence, which he immediately began serving. In October 2019, one of Sweeney's victims who he admitted to sexually abusing filed a lawsuit against the Diocese of Greensburg. The victim, who chose to remain anonymous, sought a  $1,000,000 settlement.

Roger Sinclair was laicized in 2002 after being accused of sexually abusing children in the Diocese of Greensburg. In 2018, Sinclair was convicted of sexually abusing disabled boys in the state of Oregon.

On August 13, 2020, two sexual misconduct lawsuits were filed against the Diocese of Greensburg. One of the new lawsuits was filed on behalf of a former Blairsville man who claimed at age 11 he was molested by Rev. Giles Nealen, who died in 1996, at the St. Benedict Parish in Marguerite during the summer of 1968. The other lawsuit claimed the Rev. Leonard Bealko molested a 12-year-old altar boy more than 200 times over four years that ended in 1978 at Transfiguration Church in Mt. Pleasant, his home and a church-owned rectory in Clymer.

On August 26, 2020, police arrested Fayette County priest Andrew Kawecki for sexually abusing a altar boy on multiple occasions from 2004 to 2007, beginning when the alleged victim was 11. His arrest warrant was issued by Shapiro. The same day, Bishop Malesic, who was leaving the Diocese of Greensburg to become Bishop of Cleveland, announced that the Diocese of Greensburg found sex abuse allegations against  Rev. Emil Payer, who had been convicted of stealing money his South Huntingdon church, to be "credible." On June 22, 2020, Malesic and the Diocese of Greensburg were both named as defendants in a new sex abuse lawsuit. The lawsuit was filed by a man alleging that both parties covered up reports that former Diocese of Greensburg priest Rev. Joseph L. Sredzinski, who served in Fayette County and died in 2015, started sexually abusing him in 1991, when he was 11 years old, and continued to do so until he was 17 years old.

On November 20, 2020, the Pennsylvania Supreme Court denied a petition filed by the Diocese of Greensburg to grant a stay which would've delayed an ongoing lawsuit against the Diocese.

See also

 Catholic Church by country
 Catholic Church in the United States
 Ecclesiastical Province of Philadelphia
 Global organisation of the Catholic Church
 List of Roman Catholic archdioceses (by country and continent)
 List of Roman Catholic dioceses (alphabetical) (including archdioceses)
 List of Roman Catholic dioceses (structured view) (including archdioceses)
 List of the Catholic dioceses of the United States

References

External links
Roman Catholic Diocese of Greensburg Official Site

 
Christian organizations established in 1951
Greensburg
Greensburg
1951 establishments in Pennsylvania